"A Lover's Concerto" is a pop song written by American songwriters Sandy Linzer and Denny Randell, based on the 18th century composition by Christian Petzold, "Minuet in G major", and recorded in 1965 by the Toys. "A Lover's Concerto" sold more than two million copies and was awarded gold record certification by the RIAA.

Their original version of the song was a major hit in the United States and United Kingdom (among other countries) during 1965. It peaked on the US Billboard Hot 100 chart at number 2. It was kept out of the number 1 spot by both "Yesterday" by The Beatles and "Get Off of My Cloud" by The Rolling Stones. "A Lover's Concerto" reached number 1 both on the US Cashbox chart (Billboards main competitor), and in Canada on the RPM national singles chart. It peaked at number 5 in the UK Singles Chart.

History
Linzer and Randell used the melody of the familiar "Minuet in G major" (BWV Anh. 114), which first appeared in J.S. Bach's Notebook for Anna Magdalena Bach. The only difference is that the "Minuet in G major" is written in  time, whereas "A Lover's Concerto" is arranged in  time. Although often attributed to Bach himself, the "Minuet in G major" is now generally accepted as having been written by Christian Petzold. 

The melody had been popularized by bandleader Freddy Martin in the 1940s, in a recording that was released under the title "A Lover's Concerto".

Critic Dave Thompson wrote of the Toys' version: "Few records are this perfect. Riding across one of the most deceptively hook-laden melodies ever conceived ... 'A Lover's Concerto' marks the apogee of the Girl Group sound." The song also had an unusual structure that blurred the differences between its verses and choruses.

The lyrics begin:

 How gentle is the rain
 That falls softly on the meadow,
 Birds high up in the trees
 Serenade the clouds with their melodies

Chart history

Weekly charts

Year-end charts

References

1965 singles
Songs written by Sandy Linzer
The Toys songs
Cashbox number-one singles
RPM Top Singles number-one singles
Arrangements of compositions by Johann Sebastian Bach
Songs written by Denny Randell
1965 songs
Popular songs based on classical music